Legend of the Liquid Sword is a 1993 Hong Kong wuxia comedy film loosely based on Gu Long's Chu Liuxiang novel series. The film was written and directed by Wong Jing and stars Aaron Kwok as the titular protagonist. The film is perhaps most famous for inspiring the title of legendary hip-hop album Liquid Swords.

Plot
The young Chor Lau-heung learns martial arts from Tuk-ku Kau-pai and has attained a high level of skill. His teacher sends him to Shaolin Monastery to attend a contest that is held once every ten years. On the journey, Chor meets Wu Tit-fa and Chung-yuen Yat-dim-hung. When Chor arrives at Shaolin, he fights with a Shaolin student called Mo-fa but neither of them is able to defeat each other. They decide to have a match again on another day. One night, Chor meets Mo-fa and strike up a conversation with her. Both of them decide to enter the palace in search of adventure. They disturb the prince on his wedding night but are accidentally caught in a trap and only manage to escape with the help of Chor's friends.

Meanwhile, Bat Prince breaks into Shaolin and kills Mo-fa's teacher, Tuk-ku Kau-pai and the Demonic Cult's leader. Bat Prince is actually the son of a Japanese ninja called Tin-fung Sap-say-long, and he wants to avenge his father. 17 years ago, his father came to challenge the three best fighters in China, but was defeated and committed suicide in shame. Bat Prince is not satisfied even after his victory and wants to dominate the Chinese martial arts world. Chor is injured by Bat Prince in a fight and loses his powers. Mo-fa brings him to the Holy Water Palace for treatment. Sui-mo Yam-kei heals Chor's wounds and teaches him new skills. Chor faces the Bat Prince in an epic battle.

Cast
Aaron Kwok as Chor Lau-heung
Chingmy Yau as Mo-fa
Sharla Cheung as Sui-mo Yam-kei
Anita Yuen as Lei Hung-sau
Deric Wan as Wu Tit-fa
Fennie Yuen as Chung-yuen Yat-dim-hung
Norman Chui as Tuk-ku Kau-pai
Gordon Liu as Shaolin master
Wong Yue as Tin-fung Sap-say-long
Lau Tsi-wai as Bat Prince
Gloria Yip as So Yung-yung
Winnie Lau as Sung Tim-yee
Loretta Lee as Kung Nam-yin
Wong Wan-si as Sui-pei Yam-kei
Julian Cheung as Prince (guest star)
Maple Hui as Prince's bride (guest star)
Mai Kei as Emperor (guest star)
David Tsui as Robber (guest star)
Lee Siu-kei as Bully (guest star)
Chun Wong as Eunuch Cho (guest star)
Rachel Lee
Lee Ka-ting
Yu Kwok-lok
Shing Fui-on
Wong Hung
Lau Shung-fung
Yeung Jing-jing

DVD
Mei Ah Entertainment released a dual-subtitle DVD that they have since taken out of print. Xenon Pictures handled the U.S. release which basically contains the Mei Ah version with the only difference that the entire opening sequence was replaced with a card reading simply "Liquid Sword." The original burned-in subtitles are used.

Video
The full uncut print runs 12 minutes longer than the Mei Ah (Hong Kong) and Xenon (U.S.) releases and was released in Taiwan on video by ERA Home Video.

References

External links

1993 films
1993 action comedy films
1993 martial arts films
1990s fantasy comedy films
Hong Kong fantasy adventure films
Hong Kong action comedy films
Hong Kong martial arts comedy films
Films directed by Wong Jing
Wuxia films
Works based on Chu Liuxiang (novel series)
Hong Kong fantasy comedy films
Films based on works by Gu Long
1990s Hong Kong films